The Golden Hall (Jindian or Jinding), situated at the top of Tianzhu Peak (1612m), is one of the most distinctive landmarks in Wudangshan. It was built in 1416 during the Ming dynasty. According to local histories, the hall was forged in Beijing, then carried to Wudangshan. 
The Golden Hall is one part of the Supreme Harmony Temple (Taihe Palace). Built entirely of gilded copper (an incredible 20 tons of fine copper, and 300 kilograms of gold), the hall is one of the biggest gilded copper temples in China.

The Golden Hall contains a bronze statue of Zhen Wu, another name for the Northern Emperor, Beidi (Cantonese Pak Tai), a popular Daoist deity. Around the statue stand more gilded copper statues. Between them, the statues and hall represent the best in Ming copper work.

Taoist temples in China
Ming dynasty architecture
Major National Historical and Cultural Sites in Hubei